Pope Glacier is a glacier about 20 nautical miles (37 km) long, flowing north along the west side of Mount Murphy to Crosson Ice Shelf on Walgreen Coast, in Marie Byrd Land. Mapped by United States Geological Survey (USGS) from surveys and U.S. Navy air photos, 1959–66. Named by Advisory Committee on Antarctic Names (US-ACAN) after Maj. Donald R. Pope, (CE) USA, civil engineer on the staff of the Commander, Naval Support Force, Antarctica, 1965–67.

Glaciers of Marie Byrd Land